is a Japanese rugby union player. He plays for the Japanese club Coca-Cola Red Sparks in the Top League. He was part of the squad that played at the 2014 Hong Kong Sevens and won the World Series Qualifier for the 2014–15 Sevens World Series.

He captained the squad that won the 2015 ARFU Men's Sevens Championships to qualify for the 2016 Summer Olympics. He has been selected to lead Japan's national rugby sevens team at the 2016 Summer Olympics.

References

External links 
 Japan Rugby Profile
 
 
 
 

1985 births
Living people
People from Kagoshima Prefecture
Sportspeople from Kagoshima Prefecture
People from Kagoshima
Japanese rugby union players
Japan international rugby union players
Rugby sevens players at the 2016 Summer Olympics
Olympic rugby sevens players of Japan
Japanese rugby sevens players
Asian Games medalists in rugby union
Rugby union players at the 2006 Asian Games
Rugby union players at the 2014 Asian Games
Asian Games gold medalists for Japan
Medalists at the 2006 Asian Games
Medalists at the 2014 Asian Games
Japan international rugby sevens players